Parapediasia detomatellus is a moth in the family Crambidae. It was described by Heinrich Benno Möschler in 1890. It is found in Puerto Rico and Cuba.

References

Crambini
Moths described in 1890
Moths of Central America